William Horn (born April 16, 1967) is a Canadian ice hockey coach and retired goaltender who was an All-American for Western Michigan.

Career
Horn had a 3 successful years at ND. He was voted Top Goaltender: Bill Horn (Notre Dame)at the 1984 Air Canada Cup. He won 3 consecutive starts during the round robin play including 10 periods without surrendering a goal.  Horn graduated from Athol Murray College of Notre Dame in 1985 and was recruited by Bill Wilkinson to play for Western Michigan. He became the team's starter as a freshman, taking over after the graduation of Glenn Healy, and backstopped the team to their best season in history. Horn set a program record and led the nation with 25 wins, helping WMU win 32 games that year (the only 30-win season for the program as of 2021). Horn played well during the regular season, helping the team finish in a second place tie in the CCHA, but it was in the playoffs where he became a star. While WMU had been led by their powerful offense, Horn kept his team in the semifinal against Bowling Green, winning the game in overtime. He then held top-seeded Michigan State to a single goal to claim the team's first conference championship (the Broncos would not win another for 26 years). Horn was named the Tournament MVP and led his team to their first ever NCAA Tournament appearance. While the team was swept out of the quarterfinals, Horn received a fair bit of notoriety from his performance and was drafted by the Hartford Whalers in the succeeding NHL Draft.

Western Michigan dropped back to the middle of the pack the following year but Horn played well enough to make the All-conference second team. Both he and the team saw moderate gains in his junior season but the Broncos were unable to recapture the magic of his freshman year and the team finished with a losing record in Horn's final season. The diminishing returns after the stellar freshman season left a bit of a damper on Horn's prospects, but he still was able to carve out a decent tenure as a minor league goaltender. After a year off, he made his first appearance for the Roanoke Valley Rebels in 1990 and would find himself returning to the region many times over the succeeding decade. He joined the Michigan Falcons for their inaugural season the following year and helped the team win the inaugural Colonial Hockey League regular season title. he bounced between several leagues over the next three years, never staying in one place for too long. He retired after helping the Greensboro Monarchs make an improbable run to the Riley Cup finals in 1995.

Horn won 2 Championships in Roller Hockey International in 1993 with the Anaheim Bullfrogs and 1996 with the Orlando Jackals. 

Horn returned as a player two years later, playing for three teams in the area in parts of two seasons before hanging up his pads. After several years off, he appeared in two games during the 2002–03 season for the St. Pete/Winston-Salem Parrots in their only year of existence.

After his graduation from Western Michigan Horn had started coaching the goaltending position, founding Horn Goaltending, but he began to make it a full-time position at the tail end of his professional career. In 1998 he served as a player-coach for the Winston-Salem IceHawks and continues to instruct as of 2021. Horn's sons also played hockey; Brett reaching the college ranks with SUNY Potsdam and Zac last appearing for the Carolina Jr. Hurricanes of the USPHL Premier league. In 2020–21, Horn served as the goaltending coach for the Jr. Canes.

He was inducted into the Western Michigan Athletic Hall of Fame in 2019.

Statistics

Regular season and playoffs

Awards and honors

References

External links

1967 births
Living people
AHCA Division I men's ice hockey All-Americans
Canadian ice hockey goaltenders
Ice hockey people from Saskatchewan
People from Whitewood, Saskatchewan
Western Michigan Broncos men's ice hockey players
New Haven Nighthawks players
Roanoke Valley Rebels players
Detroit Falcons (CoHL) players
Rochester Americans players
San Diego Gulls (IHL) players
Greensboro Monarchs players
Wheeling Thunderbirds players
Raleigh Icecaps players
Columbus Cottonmouths (CHL) players
Winston-Salem IceHawks players
Hartford Whalers draft picks
Canadian expatriate ice hockey people in the United States